The 2005 Elf Renault Clio Cup United Kingdom season began at Donington Park on 10 April and finished after 18 races over 9 events at Brands Hatch on 2 October. The Championship was won by Jonathan Adam driving for Total Control Racing.

Teams & Drivers
All competitors raced in Renault Clio Cup 182s. All teams and drivers were British-registered.

Season Calendar
All races were held in the United Kingdom.

Drivers' Championship

External links
 Official website
 ClioCup.com
 Timing Solutions Ltd.

Renault Clio Cup
Renault Clio Cup UK seasons